The women's 80 metres hurdles at the 1966 European Athletics Championships was held in Budapest, Hungary, at Népstadion on 2, 3, and 4 September 1966.

Medalists

Results

Final
4 September
Wind: 0.2 m/s

Semi-finals
3 September

Semi-final 1
Wind: 0 m/s

Semi-final 2
Wind: 0 m/s

Heats
2 September

Heat 1
Wind: 0 m/s

Heat 2
Wind: 0 m/s

Heat 3
Wind: 0 m/s

Heat 4
Wind: 0.1 m/s

Participation
According to an unofficial count, 26 athletes from 16 countries participated in the event.

 (1)
 (2)
 (3)
 (1)
 (2)
 (1)
 (1)
 (1)
 (1)
 (2)
 (3)
 (1)
 (1)
 (2)
 (3)
 (1)

References

80 metres hurdles
Sprint hurdles at the European Athletics Championships
Euro